Rhythm, Country and Blues (a.k.a. Rhythm Country and Blues) is an album featuring duets between R&B and country music artists on classic songs. It was released by MCA Records on March 1, 1994. The album debuted at #1 on Top Country Albums and #15 on Top R&B/Hip-Hop Albums charts. Marty Stuart's rendition of "The Weight" later appeared on his 1995 compilation The Marty Party Hit Pack. The album was nominated for the Country Music Association Award for Album of the Year in 1994.

Track listing

Production
Produced by Tony Brown & Don Was
Executive producers: Tony Brown, Al Teller, Kathy Nelson
Recorded, engineered & mixed by Bob Clearmountain
Mastered by Doug Sax

Personnel
Drums: Kenny Aronoff (tracks 1, 3, 5, 6, 9-11), Ricky Fataar (track 2), Curt Bisquera (tracks 4, 7), Paul Leim (track 8)
Percussion: Lenny Castro (tracks 1, 7), Paulinho Da Costa (tracks 6, 11), Jamie Muhoberac (track 9)
Bass: Freddie Washington (track 1), Hutch Hutchinson (tracks 2, 4, 5, 7, 9), Willie Weeks (tracks 3, 6, 10, 11), Glenn Worf (track 8)
Keyboards, Organ, Piano, Synthesizers: Benmont Tench (tracks 1-4, 6, 7, 11), Nat Adderley (track 1), Billy Preston (track 2), Matt Rollings (tracks 5, 9), Steve Nathan (tracks 6, 8, 10, 11), Barry Beckett (tracks 6, 10, 11), David Briggs (track 8), Allen Toussaint (track 9)
Acoustic & electric guitars: Mark Goldenberg (tracks 1, 3, 7, 9), Reggie Young (tracks 1, 3, 6, 8, 10, 11), Mabon Hodges (track 2), Randy Jacobs (tracks 2, 7, 9), T-Bone Burnett (track 4), Bernie Leadon (track 5), Larry Byrom (tracks 5, 8), Don Potter (tracks 6, 10, 11), Chet Atkins (track 9)
Pedal steel: Robby Turner (tracks 1-3, 5, 6, 8, 10, 11)
Saxophone: Andrew Love (tracks 2, 11), Marty Grebb (track 4)
Trumpet: Wayne Jackson (tracks 2, 11)
Horn arrangements: Jim Horn (The Southside Horns) (track 8)
Strings arranged by David Campbell (tracks 1, 6, 11)
Background vocals for "Patches": Jonell Mosser, Sweet Pea Atkinson, Sir Harry Bowens and Arnold McCuller

Charts

Weekly charts

Year-end charts

References

1994 albums
MCA Records albums
Vocal duet albums
Covers albums
Albums produced by Tony Brown (record producer)
Albums produced by Don Was